Conus balteatus, common name the Mauritian cone, is a species of sea snail, a marine gastropod mollusk in the family Conidae, the cone snails and their allies.

Like all species within the genus Conus, these snails are predatory and venomous. They are capable of "stinging" humans, therefore live ones should be handled carefully or not at all.

The subspecies: Conus balteatus pigmentatus A. Adams & Reeve, 1848 is accepted as Conus balteatus G. B. Sowerby I, 1833

Description
The size of an adult shell varies between 13 mm and 33 mm. The shell is olive-brown or brown violaceous, with a more or less irregular white band below the middle, and another one below the tuberculated spire. The interior of the aperture is tinged with violet.

Distribution
This species occurs in the Indian Ocean off the Mascarene Basin and in the Western Pacific Ocean (New Caledonia, Vanuatu, Papua New Guinea)

Gallery
Below are several color forms and one subspecies:

References

 Smith, E. A. 1877. Descriptions of new species of Conidae and Terebridae. Ann. Mag. nat. Hist. (4) 19: 222–231.
 Drivas, J. & M. Jay (1988). Coquillages de La Réunion et de l'île Maurice
 Filmer R.M. (2001). A Catalogue of Nomenclature and Taxonomy in the Living Conidae 1758–1998. Backhuys Publishers, Leiden. 388pp
 Bozzetti L. (2007) Conus olgiatii (Gastropoda: Prosobranchia: Conidae) nuova specie dal Madagascar Sud-Occidentale. Malacologia Mostra Mondiale 54: 16–17.
 Bozzetti L. (2008) Conus anosyensis (Gastropoda: Prosobranchia: Conidae) nuova specie dal Madagascar Sud-Orientale. Malacologia Mostra Mondiale 58: 15
 Tucker J.K. (2009). Recent cone species database. September 4, 2009 Edition
 Bozzetti L. (2012) Two new species of Conidae (Gastropoda: Prosobranchia) from Southern and South-Western Madagascar. Malacologia Mostra Mondiale 74: 4-6. [February 2012]
 Puillandre N., Duda T.F., Meyer C., Olivera B.M. & Bouchet P. (2015). One, four or 100 genera? A new classification of the cone snails. Journal of Molluscan Studies. 81: 1–23

External links
 The Conus Biodiversity website
 
 Cone Shells – Knights of the Sea

balteatus
Gastropods described in 1833